{{Speciesbox
|name = Grey bush-pea
|image = Pultenaea spinosa flower.jpg
|genus = Pultenaea
|species = spinosa
|authority = (DC.) H.B.Will.
|synonyms_ref = 
|synonyms = {{collapsible list|
 Euchilus cuspidatus F.Muell. 
 Gastrolobium hugelii Henfr. 
 Oxylobium spinosum DC. 
 Pultenaea cunninghamii (Benth.) F.Muell. nom. inval.
 Pultenaea cunninghamii (Benth.) F.Muell. ex H.B.Will. 
 Pultenaea cunninghamii (Benth.) F.Muell. ex H.B.Will. var. cunninghamii 
 Pultenaea cunninghamii var. pubescens Benth. ex H.B.Will. 
 Pultenaea cunninghamii var. pubescens Benth. ex Ewart nom. illeg.
 Pultenaea oxalidifolia Steud. nom. inval., nom. nud.
 Pultenaea sp. 'Maryborough' (T.D.Stanley 87) 
 Pultenaea sp. (Maryborough T.Stanley 87) 
 Pultenaea sp. Hidden Valley (B.Jackes Dec 1976) 
 Pultenaea ternata (F.Muell. ex Hannaford) F.Muell. 
 Pultenaea ternata var. cuspidata (F.Muell.) Benth. 
 Pultenaea ternata var. pubescens Benth. 
 Pultenaea ternata (F.Muell. ex Hannaford) F.Muell. var. ternata 
 Spadostyles cunninghamii Benth. 
 Spadostyles ternata F.Muell. ex Hannaford 
 Spadostylis cunninghami F.Muell. orth. var.
 Spadostylis ternata F.Muell.  
}}
}}Pultenaea spinosa, commonly known as grey bush-pea or spiny bush-pea, is a species of flowering plant in the family Fabaceae and is endemic to south-eastern continental Australia. It is a low-lying to erect shrub with glabrous stems, egg-shaped to rhombic leaves, and yellow-orange and red, pea-like flowers.

Taxonomy
Grey bush-pea was first formally described in 1825 by Augustin Pyramus de Candolle who gave it the name Oxylobium spinosum in Prodromus Systematis Naturalis Regni Vegetabilis. In 1922, Herbert Bennett Williamson changed the name to Pultenaea spinosa in the Proceedings of the Royal Society of Victoria. The specific epithet (spinosa) means "spiny".

Distribution and habitatPultenaea spinosa'' grows in forest in rocky sites in eastern Queensland south from the Leichhardt district, in eastern New South Wales, the Australian Capital Territory and north-eastern Victoria.

References

Fabales of Australia
Flora of New South Wales
Flora of Queensland
Flora of the Australian Capital Territory
Flora of Victoria (Australia)
spinosa
Plants described in 1825
Taxa named by Augustin Pyramus de Candolle